The 1899–1900 Ohio State Buckeyes men's basketball team represented the Ohio State University in its second  season of collegiate basketball. Their coach was unknown. They finished with an 8-4 record.

Schedule

References
 Ohio State University Athletics, 2013-14 Men's Basketball Media Guide, p 182.

Ohio State Buckeyes men's basketball seasons
Ohio State
Ohio State Buckeyes Men's Basketball Team
Ohio State Buckeyes Men's Basketball Team